The World's Tallest Grandfather Clock is a roadside attraction in downtown Kewaunee, Wisconsin. It is a 36 foot tall Colonial-style redwood grandfather clock built in 1976. It is located at the Ahnapee State Trail trailhead.

References

Tourist attractions in Kewaunee County, Wisconsin
Clock towers in Wisconsin
1976 establishments in Wisconsin
Towers completed in 1976
http://www.greenbaypressgazette.com/story/news/local/kewaunee-county/2015/08/07/city-joins-restore-worlds-largest-grandfather-clock/31282091/